Vodnobuyerachnoye is a rural locality (a selo) and the administrative center of Vodnobuyerachnoye Rural Settlement, Kamyshinsky District, Volgograd Oblast, Russia. The population was 1,071 as of 2010. There are 10 streets.

Geography 
Vodnobuyerachnoye is located in forest steppe, on the Volga Upland, 64 km northeast of Kamyshin (the district's administrative centre) by road. Verkhnyaya Kulaninka is the nearest rural locality.

References 

Rural localities in Kamyshinsky District